The Revolutionary Goans Party (RGP) is a regional party in the Indian state of Goa. The party was first registered in January 2022.  The party contested 38 seats in the 2022 Goa Legislative Assembly election, winning the St Andre constituency. The party's "anti-migrant" policies have been classified as similar to the Maharashtra Navnirman Sena (MNS).

Person of Goan Origin Bill 2019 

The introduction of the bill became a major election plant for the Revolutionary Goans Party which defines a person of Goan origin as “A person of Goan Origin” of the state of Goa shall mean a person who is or whose either parent or grandparent was born in Goa prior to 20 December 1961 or who had a permanent habitation in Goa prior to 20 December 1961 and who were citizens of India post-liberation irrespective of nationality or passport they hold currently.

References

Regionalist parties in India
Political parties in Goa
Political parties established in 2022
2022 establishments in Goa
Organisations based in Goa